Ivesdal Chapel is a parish church of the Church of Norway in Bjerkreim Municipality in Rogaland county, Norway. It is located in the village of Øvrebygd. It is one of the two churches for the Bjerkreim parish which is part of the Dalane prosti (deanery) in the Diocese of Stavanger. The white, wooden church was built in a long church style in 1876 using designs by the architects Larsen and Helleland. The church seats about 210 people.

See also
List of churches in Rogaland

References

Bjerkreim
Churches in Rogaland
Wooden churches in Norway
19th-century Church of Norway church buildings
Churches completed in 1876
1876 establishments in Norway